Echelus is a genus of eels in the snake-eel family Ophichthidae.

Species
There are currently 4 recognized species in this genus:
 Echelus myrus (Linnaeus, 1758) (Painted eel)
 Echelus pachyrhynchus (Vaillant, 1888)
 Echelus polyspondylus J. E. McCosker & H. C. Ho, 2015 (Many-vertebrae snake eel) 
 Echelus uropterus (Temminck & Schlegel, 1846) (Finned snake eel)

References

Ophichthidae
Taxa named by Constantine Samuel Rafinesque